The UB40 File is a compilation album of all of UB40's 1980 Graduate recordings.  The album first appeared as a double vinyl LP in 1985 and features all the tracks from Signing Off on Record One, the 3 tracks from the 12" single that accompanied Signing Off on the A-side of Record Two with the tracks released as singles that did not feature on the debut album on B-side.

A CD followed in 1986. The band's official website lists "The Earth Dies Screaming" and "Dream a Lie" as being the 12" extended versions.

The album is very similar to the 1983 compilation More UB40 Music released in The Netherlands.

Track listings

CD
Tyler
King
Burden of Shame
I Think It's Going to Rain Today
Food for Thought
Signing Off
Madame Medusa
Strange Fruit
My Way of Thinking
The Earth Dies Screaming
Dream a Lie

Double LP
Record 1, Side 1
Tyler
King
12 Bar
Burden of Shame
Record 1, Side 2
Adella
I Think It's Going to Rain Today
25%
Food for Thought
Little by Little
Signing Off
Record 2, Side 1
Madame Medusa
Strange Fruit
Reefer Madness
Record 2, Side 2
My Way of Thinking
The Earth Dies Screaming
Dream a Lie

1985 compilation albums
UB40 compilation albums